The National Council of Churches in New Zealand (NCCNZ) was an ecumenical organisation that brought together a number of New Zealand's Christian churches in dialogue and practical cooperation.

The NCCNZ worked in collaboration with state ecumenical councils around New Zealand. It was an associate council of the World Council of Churches, a member of the Christian Conference of Asia and a partner of other national ecumenical bodies throughout the world. It was succeeded by the Conference of Churches in Aotearoa New Zealand (which was itself dissolved in 2005).

See also
Christianity in New Zealand
World Council of Churches

References

Christianity in New Zealand
New Zealand
Christian organizations established in 1941
1941 establishments in New Zealand
1989 disestablishments in New Zealand